The Battle of Chudnov (Chudniv, Cudnów) took place from 14 October to 2 November 1660, between the forces of the Polish–Lithuanian Commonwealth, allied with the Crimean Tatars, and the Tsardom of Russia, allied with the Cossacks. It ended with a decisive Polish victory, and the truce of Chudnov. The entire Russian army, including its commander, was taken into jasyr slavery by the Tatars. The battle was the largest and most important Polish victory over the Russian forces until the battle of Warsaw in 1920.

Background
In July 1660, tsar Alexis I of Russia ordered Vasily Sheremetev to resume the sporadic Russo-Polish War (1654–1667), and push the Poles west, taking Lwów (Lviv) and securing disputed Ukrainian territories for Russia.

In September 1660, the commander of the Russian army, Sheremetev – acting on misleading information greatly underestimating the numerical strength of the Polish army – decided to seek out and destroy the Polish forces with what he believed would be overwhelming strength (15,000 Russian soldiers and 15,000–35,000 of his Cossack allies). Sheremetev's major tactical error was to advance relying on outdated and sparse intelligence reports, and without adequate scouting; he expected only a weak army of 10,000 (in fact, it numbered only about 7,000) under Great Crown Hetman Stanisław "Rewera" Potocki, and was unaware it was soon to be reinforced by about 12,000 men under Field Crown Hetman Jerzy Sebastian Lubomirski who had recently defeated Russian army in Lithuania.

The Polish commanders – hetmans Potocki and Lubomirski – had much better intelligence (they were also aided by Ivan Vyhovsky's spy network), and became quickly aware of Sheremetev's error. Polish historian Łossowski notes that "while Shermetev's advanced blindly, Polish hetmans knew almost everything about his army and moves". The Poles decided to engage Shermetev's forces before he in turn would be reinforced by his Cossack allies. A portion of the Cossacks (about 15,000 under Timofey Tsetsura (Polish: Tymofiej Cieciura) were to stay with Sheremetev's corps, and another part (about 20,000 under Yurii Khmelnytsky), according to Sheremetev's plan, were to intercept and defeat the 12,000-strong Tatars from the Crimean Khanate under nuradyn-sultan Safer Giray (of whose coming to Polish aid Sheremetev was aware) – but Khmelnytsky failed to do so, with most of the Tatar forces slipping past them around middle of August. Further, Cossack's leader, Yurii Khmelnytsky, was increasingly at odds with Sheremetev (who favored Tsetsura over Khmelnytsky, and who refused to promise Khmelnytsky any loot from the upcoming battles), and was in no hurry to execute his orders or stick to his plan. The Tatars met Potocki's forces on 1 September, and they in turn met with Lubomirski on 7 September, while Khmelnytsky were still far from Shermetev's army.

The combined Polish army (not counting 12,000 Tatars and 1,500 Cossacks under Vyhovsky) numbered about 27,000 (including about 700 Winged Hussars, 8,000 pancerni, 3,500 light cavalry, 1,500 raitars, 5,000 dragoons, and 10,000 infantry). Sheremetev troops (not counting Cossacks) numbered 18,000 (including 4,500 Russian traditional cavalry, 5,500 raitars, 3,500 dragoons, 3,000 foreign infantry and 1,000 streltsy).

The Russian army was surprised near Lubar on 14 September. Shermetev's front guard was wiped out, and Sheremetev – who until then had failed to send a single scouting party and suddenly realized what was to be an easy victory was a death trap – decided to take defensive positions in a fortified camp. Numerical superiority of the Polish forces, lack of supplies and several minor defeats convinced him to break away on 26 September. The plan succeeded at first but Polish forces caught the Russian army during its crossing of the Iber River, and captured or destroyed a significant portion of the remaining Russian artillery and supplies. The Polish forces caught up again with the Russians on 27 September, near Chudniv. At that point, the Russian and Cossack armies had lost about 1,000 troops, and the Poles about 100 (not counting the wounded). Sheremetev also received a minor reinforcement by attaching Chudniv's garrison (about 1,000 troops) to his main army.

Battle
Sheremetev decided to stop the Poles by repeating his previous tactics. He burned the town on the side the Poles were approaching from, and created a new camp on the other side of the river. The Poles took the other bank, including the local fort, which Sheremetev abandoned, and which provided them with a useful stronghold and observation point. The Tatars drove the Russians foraging parties into their main camp, but for now no major encounters took place. The Poles were however able to surround the Russian camp, and started engineering works designed to flood their camp.

The Poles learned that a Cossack army under Khmelnytsky numbering over 20,000 was approaching the area. To prevent it from combining forces with the Russians, the Poles split an 8,000-strong force under Lubomirski, which stopped the Cossacks near Slobodyshche (Polish: Słobodyszcze). The battle of Slobodyshche took place around 7 October and 8 October; however, some historians speculate that there was never any battle of Slobodyshche, and it was a misidentification created by Khmelnytsky and Polish commanders (Khmelnytsky did not want to aid Sheremetev, and Poles were able to concentrate on that task); there is however no consensus on that variant.

On 8 October, facing hunger, flooding and low morale, Sheremetev tried to break out of the camp but was defeated. Another attempt on 14 October, initially more successful, proved to be also futile and only succeeded in moving the camp to a non-flooded area.

In the meantime, Khmelnytsky (also suffering from heavy desertions) decided to enter negotiations with the Poles. The Treaty of Cudnów was signed on 17 October, and mostly repeated the 1657 Treaty of Hadiach (although the creation of the Grand Duchy of Ruthenia had to be confirmed by the Polish king) and pledged Cossacks allegiance to the Poles. Having learned that Khmelnytsky signed the treaty with the Poles, Tsetsura decided to defect, and did so on 21 October (his Cossacks were however ambushed by the Tatars and suffered heavy casualties). The Cossacks were no longer allied with the Russians. One Russian army was defeated in the north, and another one tied up in Kiev, where they suspected a Polish-Cossack uprising may occur. Russian commander Boriatyński in Kiev was able to muster only about 5,000-strong army, but retreated to Kiev having learned that Polish reinforcements (numbering about few thousands and led by Stefan Czarniecki and Jakub Potocki) were approaching. Abandoned by his allies, and failing to break through the Polish lines on 22 October, Sheremetev decided to enter negotiations on 23 October; he capitulated on 4 November. The Russians were allowed to retreat but had to leave their weapons, abandon Kiev, Pereiaslav and Chernihiv and pay 300,000 talars. Sheremetev and several of his officers were to remain Polish prisoners.

The remaining Cossacks (numbering around 8,000), abandoned by Tsetsura and Khmelnytsky, left the Russian camp on 3 November, but were ambushed by the Tatars; surrounded and with no help from their former Russian allies, nearly all were taken captive (see jasyr). The Tatars were however unhappy with the little loot they had captured, but even more with the capitulation – they wanted the Poles, Cossacks and the Russians to fight among themselves as much as possible (since they were all Christian enemies of Islam); and attacked the Russian camp after they surrendered, on the night of 4 November and 5 November. After a short skirmish with the Poles the latter decided to allow the Tatars to take what they wanted; and even Sheremetev himself was transferred by Poles to the Tatars (he never returned to Russia, and died in 1682 still their captive, although a Cossack army managed to intercept part of the Tatars and take back several thousand captives later).

Aftermath
The battle was a major victory for the Poles, who succeeded in eliminating most of Russian forces, weakened the Cossacks and kept their alliance with the Crimean Tatars. The Poles, however, were unable to capitalize on that victory; their army retreated in poor order (there was little aid for the wounded, which accounted for hundreds of deaths after the battle). Furthermore, the country had failed to provide wages for most of the army, which resulted in mutinies in 1661. This prevented the Poles from taking initiative and allowed the Russians time to rebuild their armies.

Yury Baryatinsky who commanded the Russian garrison in Kiev refused to follow Sheremetev's agreement with the Poles and leave the city, saying his famous phrase "I obey only His Majesty, not Sheremetev. There are many Sheremetevs in Moscow!" The Poles did not risk attacking the city which thus remained in Russian hands. A similar development took place in Pereyaslav whose inhabitants led by Yakym Somko swore "to die for the great Tsar, for God's churches and Orthodox faith".

The Battle of Chudnov is commemorated on the Tomb of the Unknown Soldier, Warsaw, with the inscription "CUDNOW 14 IX-3 X 1660".

See also
The Ruin (Ukrainian history)

Notes
a.  Numerical estimates are based on 1995 work of Łukasz Ossoliński; in particular his Chapter 3 dedicated to estimating strength of opposing forces. He notes that older historiography often overestimated numbers for that battle (for example, a common mistake in Polish historiography was to estimate Russian forces at 50,000).

References
Inline:

General:
 Łukasz Ossoliński, "Cudnów – Słobodyszcze 1660", Inforteditions 2006, 
 Łukasz Ossoliński, "Kampania na Ukrainie 1660 roku"; doctoral thesis (University of Warsaw), 1995, available here
 Mała Encyklopedia Wojskowa, Tom I, A-J, Warszawa 1967, Wydanie I

Further reading
 Antoni Hniłko, "Wyprawa cudnowska w 1660 roku", Wojskowy instytut naukowo-wydawniczy, 1931
 Romański Romuald, "Cudnów 1660 (Historyczne bitwy)", Bellona 1996, 
 Winged Hussars, Radoslaw Sikora, Bartosz Musialowicz, BUM Magazine, 2016.

Chudnov
Conflicts in 1660
1660 in Europe
Cudnow 1660